Jalan Besar Salak (Selangor State Route B48) is a major road in Selangor, Malaysia.

Route background
The Kilometre Zero of Jalan Besar Salak starts at Sepang town, at its interchange with the Federal Route 5, the main trunk road of the west coast of Peninsular Malaysia.

Features

At most sections, the Selangor State Route B48 was built under the JKR R5 road standard, allowing maximum speed limit of up to 90 km/h.

There are no alternate routes or sections with motorcycle lanes.

List of junctions

Roads in Selangor

References